The Creation Engine is a 3D video game engine created by Bethesda Game Studios based on the Gamebryo engine. The Creation Engine has been used to create role-playing video games such as The Elder Scrolls V: Skyrim, Fallout 4, and Fallout 76.

Development
After using the Gamebryo engine to create The Elder Scrolls III: Morrowind, The Elder Scrolls IV: Oblivion, and Fallout 3, Bethesda decided that Gamebryo's capabilities were becoming too outdated and began work on the Creation Engine for their next game, The Elder Scrolls V: Skyrim, by forking the codebase used for Fallout 3.

Following the completion of Skyrim, Bethesda set out to enhance the graphical core of the Creation Engine by first adding a physically based deferred renderer to allow for more dynamic lighting and to paint materials object surfaces with realistic materials. Bethesda worked with technology company Nvidia to implement volumetric lighting through a technique that makes use of hardware tesselation. Additionally the updated version of the Creation Engine powering Bethesda's Fallout 4 offers more advanced character generation.

Bethesda Game Studios Austin (at the time BattleCry Studios) was tasked with modifying the Creation Engine to support multiplayer content in preparation for the development of Fallout 76 shortly before the release of Fallout 4, while Bethesda Game Studios began development of Starfield and downloadable content for Fallout 4. In conjunction with id Software (a fellow ZeniMax subsidiary), BattleCry attempted to integrate id's Quake netcode into Fallout 4'''s engine. This was considered a challenge by experts in the online game industry. A primary issue facing the developers was that components of the core engine (dating back to Gamebryo used in The Elder Scrolls III: Morrowind) such as quests or world loading were designed centering on a single player (dubbed "Atlas" by the developers for its role in holding up the fabric of the loaded game world), a paradigm that would need to fundamentally change to allow multiple players spanning multiple worlds.

In addition to the network changes to the engine used in Fallout 4, the Fallout 76 implementation of the engine was described at the game's E3 reveal as having "all new rendering, lighting, and landscape technology". Bethesda Game Studios claims the improvements also allow for a 16× increase in detail and the ability to view unique weather systems occurring at a distance.

Bethesda revealed in June 2021 that they were working on a new iteration of the engine simply called the Creation Engine 2, and that it would power their upcoming games Starfield and The Elder Scrolls VI.

Features
 Havok Behavior is a flexible animation tool that allows the developers to blend animations together in a few clicks. This means that animations such as walking and running can be blended together seamlessly to make the animations look much more realistic. This important addition enabled Bethesda to improve character animations in their games.
 An upgraded version of Radiant AI allows non-player characters (NPCs) to dynamically react and interact with the world around them. The player can observe an NPC eat breakfast, go to work, go to the pub, and then go to sleep. The improved AI allows NPCs to react to the player's actions and they can become friendly or hostile to the player because of their actions.
 Radiant Story allows for NPCs to dynamically create new quests for the player in unexplored places.
 In previous games, Bethesda licensed SpeedTree for trees and foliage, but when making Skyrim with Creation Engine, the Bethesda team made their own foliage rendering system. The new system is capable of rendering larger amounts of foliage at one time and allows for more freedom with animations.

Creation Kit

The Creation Kit is a modding tool for Creation Engine games. The Creation Kit takes advantage of the Creation Engine's modular nature. It was created by Bethesda Game Studios for the modding community of The Elder Scrolls series. The tool can be used to create worlds, races, NPCs, weapons, update textures, and fix bugs. Mods created using this tool are hosted on the Steam Workshop, Nexus Mods, Bethesda.net and various other sites.

A Fallout 4–compatible Creation Kit was released in April 2016.

The Creation Kit is a new version of Bethesda's editor developed for Gamebryo, known as The Elder Scrolls Construction Set for The Elder Scrolls III: Morrowind and The Elder Scrolls IV: Oblivion, and as the Garden of Eden Creation Kit for Fallout 3 (referencing an in-game item of the same name).

Games using Creation Engine

Creation Engine
 The Elder Scrolls V: Skyrim (2011)
 The Elder Scrolls V: Skyrim – Special Edition (2016)
 The Elder Scrolls V: Skyrim VR (2017)
 The Elder Scrolls V: Skyrim – Anniversary Edition (2021)
 Fallout 4 (2015)
 Fallout 4 VR (2017)
 Fallout 76 (2018)

Creation Engine 2
 Starfield (2023)
 The Elder Scrolls VI (TBA)
 Fallout 5'' (TBA)

References

2011 software
3D graphics software
The Elder Scrolls
Fallout (series)
Proprietary software
Video game engines